Turgenevsky (masculine), Turgenevskaya (feminine), or Turgenevskoye (neuter) may refer to:
Turgenevskoye Urban Settlement, a municipal formation into which Turgenevo Work Settlement in Ardatovsky District of the Republic of Mordovia, Russia is incorporated
Turgenevsky (rural locality), several rural localities in Russia
Turgenevskaya, a station of the Moscow Metro, Moscow, Russia